Francis Anthony Stapleton (born 10 July 1956) is an Irish former professional football player and manager. He is best remembered for his time at Arsenal, Manchester United and as a pivotal player for the Republic of Ireland national team. He has also been manager at Bradford City and MLS club New England Revolution.

Playing career
Stapleton was a distinguished centre forward, once touted as being among the best in the world in his position, and an exceptionally strong header of the ball. He started his career with Arsenal, joining them in 1972 as an apprentice, after being turned down by Manchester United. He made his first-team debut in March 1975, at home to Stoke City, and would go on to form a potent striking partnership with Malcolm Macdonald; the two scored 46 goals between them in 1976–77. He was Arsenal's top scorer for the three following seasons, and helped the Gunners reach a trio of FA Cup finals; Stapleton scored one of the goals in Arsenal's 1979 FA Cup Final 3–2 win over Manchester United, and scored 108 goals in 300 appearances in total for the Gunners.

Stapleton went on to move to Manchester United in the summer of 1981 for £900,000 (a fee set by tribunal after the two clubs could not agree) as new manager Ron Atkinson began building a team capable of challenging for silverware after a disappointing 1980–81 season under Dave Sexton. He helped United win the 1983 and 1985 FA Cups. It was in the first of those finals, when he scored against Brighton, in which Stapleton made history by becoming the first man to score for two different clubs in FA Cup Finals. United finished in the top four of the league in each of Stapleton's first five seasons at Old Trafford, and came close to winning a league title medal in the 1985–86 season after United won their first ten league games of the season before their form slumped and they finished fourth. Atkinson was sacked and replaced by Alex Ferguson in November 1986, and Stapleton remained a regular member of the first team under the new manager, but he left at the end of the season to sign for Ajax. There, he made just six appearances and scored one goal before quickly being moved to Belgian side Anderlecht at the end of 1987, followed by a three-month loan back to England with Derby County. He then played for French club Le Havre for a season, before returning to England with Blackburn Rovers in 1989, followed by moves to Aldershot, Huddersfield Town (as player-coach) and Bradford City.	

After three seasons as player-manager at Bradford, he was sacked following their narrow failure to qualify for the Division Two playoffs at the end of the 1993-94 season. He then had a brief spell at Brighton & Hove Albion in the 1994–95 season, playing two games before finally announcing his retirement as a player.

International career
Stapleton also won 71 caps for the Republic of Ireland national team, scoring a then record 20 goals. Stapleton made his international debut under then player-manager Johnny Giles in a friendly against Turkey in Ankara in 1976 at 20 years of age. He scored after only three minutes of his debut when he headed home a Giles free-kick at the near post. That friendly international finished 3–3 and marked the start of a magnificent international career for the quiet and reserved Stapleton.

Stapleton was committed to international football insisting that an "international release clause" be inserted to all of his contracts so that he could be released to play in international games for Ireland.

Stapleton played a significant role in Ireland's attempt to qualify for the World Cup in Spain in 1982. Goals against Cyprus, the Netherlands and France for Stapleton in the qualifying matches were not enough as Ireland were denied a place at the World Cup by a superior French goal difference. Stapleton was made captain of the national team for the qualifying campaign for the 1986 World Cup though Ireland failed to emulate their fine performance in the 1982 qualifiers.

Jack Charlton took over as the Irish manager in 1986 and he kept Stapleton as captain despite a sometimes uneasy relationship between the two men. Stapleton scored a magnificent diving header in the opening Euro 1988 qualifier against Belgium in the 2–2 draw at the Heysel Stadium, Brussels that September. He also scored in the 2–1 defeat by Bulgaria in Sofia on 1 April 1987, with another goal against Luxembourg in the 2–1 victory at Lansdowne Road the following September.

Stapleton captained the Irish team to the 1988 Euro finals and played in all of their matches during the competition including Ireland's famous victory against England.

After the 1988, European Championships Stapleton remained on the fringe of the national team during qualification for World Cup Italia 1990 making just two appearances late in the campaign. By then, his 20 goals for the Republic had made him the national side's all-time leading goalscorer – a record which would be broken ten years later by Niall Quinn, who was in the early stages of his own international career when Stapleton bowed out of the international scene.

He did, however, score an 87th-minute goal against Malta in a 3–0 friendly in Valletta just prior to those finals in Italy.

Managerial career
Stapleton moved to the United States to manage Major League Soccer side New England Revolution in 1996. In the 2003–04 season he briefly returned to English football as a specialist coach of Bolton Wanderers. The Bolton manager Sam Allardyce wanted Stapleton to enhance the skills of the strikers at the club and saw the Irishman as an ideal candidate, given his successful playing career.

Stapleton was appointed assistant manager to former teammate Ray Wilkins with Jordan on 3 September 2014.

Career statistics
Scores and results list Republic of Ireland's goal tally first, score column indicates score after each Stapleton goal.

Honours
Arsenal
 FA Cup: 1978–79

Manchester United
 FA Cup: 1982–83, 1984–85
 FA Charity Shield: 1983

Individual
 Arsenal Player of the Season: 1976–77, 1979–80
 PFA Team of the Year: 1983–84 First Division

References

External links

Republic of Ireland Record
FAI Profile

1956 births
Living people
Association footballers from Dublin (city)
Association football forwards
Republic of Ireland association footballers
English Football League players
Eredivisie players
Ligue 2 players
Arsenal F.C. players
Manchester United F.C. players
AFC Ajax players
R.S.C. Anderlecht players
Derby County F.C. players
Le Havre AC players
Blackburn Rovers F.C. players
Aldershot F.C. players
Huddersfield Town A.F.C. players
Bradford City A.F.C. players
Brighton & Hove Albion F.C. players
Republic of Ireland football managers
Bradford City A.F.C. managers
New England Revolution coaches
Bolton Wanderers F.C. non-playing staff
Republic of Ireland international footballers
UEFA Euro 1988 players
1990 FIFA World Cup players
Republic of Ireland expatriate association footballers
Expatriate footballers in the Netherlands
Irish expatriate sportspeople in the Netherlands
Expatriate footballers in Belgium
Irish expatriate sportspeople in Belgium
Expatriate footballers in France
Irish expatriate sportspeople in France
Irish expatriate sportspeople in the United States
Huddersfield Town A.F.C. non-playing staff
Expatriate soccer managers in the United States
Republic of Ireland expatriate football managers
Irish expatriate sportspeople in England
People from Artane, Dublin
FA Cup Final players